Double Exposure is a 1954 British crime film directed by John Gilling and starring John Bentley, Rona Anderson and Garry Marsh. It was made at Southall Studios as a second feature. The film's sets were designed by Wilfred Arnold.

Cast
 John Bentley as Pete Fleming
 Rona Anderson as Barbara Leyland 
 Garry Marsh as Beaumont 
 Alexander Gauge as Denis Clayton  
 Ingeborg von Kusserow as Maxine Golder  
 John Horsley as Lamport  
 Doris Hare as Woman Police Sergeant  
 Eric Berry
 Frank Forsyth as Inspector Grayle 
 Ronan O'Casey as Trickson  
 Alan Robinson
 Ryck Rydon as Trixon  
 Sally Newton
 Rita Webb as Flower seller

References

Bibliography
 Chibnall, Steve & McFarlane, Brian. The British 'B' Film. Palgrave MacMillan, 2009.

External links

1954 films
British crime films
1954 crime films
Films directed by John Gilling
Films shot at Southall Studios
1950s English-language films
British black-and-white films
1950s British films